Imado (今戸) is a former township located today in Asakusa, eastern Tokyo. 

A maneki-neko legend of an old woman takes places in Imado.

Imado dolls come from there. Imado ware also originates from there.

External links 

 http://ginjo.fc2web.com/163imadonokitune/imadonokitune.htm

Asakusa
Neighborhoods of Tokyo